Pseudognaphalium californicum (syn. Gnaphalium californicum) is a species of flowering plant in the family Asteraceae known by several common names, including ladies' tobacco, California rabbit tobacco, California cudweed, and California everlasting.

The plant is native to the west coast of North America from Washington to Baja California, where it is a member of the flora of many habitats, including chaparral.

Description

Pseudognaphalium californicum is an annual or biennial herb growing a branching stem reaching 20 to 80 centimeters in height. Stem branches bear linear to somewhat lance-shaped leaves 2 to 20 centimeters long. The green herbage is glandular and scented. The leaves produce a distinctive citrus aroma.

The inflorescence is a wide cluster of flower heads, each enveloped in an involucre of rows of bright white phyllaries.

Classification
Classification is disputed between the genera Pseudognaphalium and Gnaphalium.

Images

External links
Jepson Manual Treatment: Pseudognaphalium californicum
USDA Plants Profile: Pseudognaphalium californicum
Flora of North America

Pseudognaphalium californicum — U.C. Photo gallery

californicum
Flora of California
Flora of Baja California
Flora of Oregon
Flora of the Cascade Range
Flora of the Klamath Mountains
Flora of the Sierra Nevada (United States)
Natural history of the California chaparral and woodlands
Natural history of the California Coast Ranges
Natural history of the Channel Islands of California
Natural history of the Peninsular Ranges
Natural history of the San Francisco Bay Area
Natural history of the Santa Monica Mountains
Natural history of the Transverse Ranges
Plants described in 1838
Flora without expected TNC conservation status